The 9th Ukrainian Verkhovna Rada began its term on 29 August 2019. 423 people's deputies were elected during the 2019 Ukrainian parliamentary elections.

Party list People's Deputies

Single-mandate district People's Deputies

People's Deputies who left

Notes

References 

2019-23
Parliamentary election
Ukraine